The AVCEN Jetpod was a design proposal for a very quiet aircraft that could take off and land in short distances (STOL), developed by Avcen Limited, a company incorporated on 18 October 1988 which became a subsidiary of the Hong Kong-based company, Profit Sky Group Ltd. 

A number of applications were proposed, including as a military transport, an executive transport, and as a short to medium-range air taxi. Avcen Limited was the British-based headquarters while Avcen Limited Malaysia was based at Patimas Technology Centre, Technology Park, Bukit Jalil, Kuala Lumpur. According to Avcen's publicity materials, the Jetpod's maximum speed was designed to be . It would need only  to take-off or land, allowing runways to be constructed close to the center of major cities, and would be sufficiently quiet to not be noticeable above city traffic. 

On 16 August 2009, a just-completed prototype Jetpod crashed, killing the founder of Avcen, Michael Robert Dacre, who was the sole occupant. Dacre had attempted to take off three times and on the fourth successfully lifted off before stalling and crashing.  According to Taiping deputy police chief Syed A. Wahab Syed A. Majid, the company had not obtained permission from the Royal Malaysian Air Force to conduct the flight tests.

References

External links
Video of the crash showing what craft looked like before takeoff
Another video of the crash from a different angle
Video of the crash aftermath
Gizmag article on the jetpod
Avcen Limited's website
CAD Images of the "jet pod"

Proposed aircraft of the United Kingdom